Gjon Muzaka (fl. 1510) was an Albanian nobleman from the Muzaka family, that has historically ruled in the Myzeqe region, Albania. In 1510 he wrote a Breve memoria de li discendenti de nostra casa Musachi (Short memoir on the descendants of our Myzeqe lineage). The work was published in Karl Hopf's Chroniques gréco-romaines, Paris 1873, pp. 270–340.

According to his memoirs, Gjon's father died before Ottomans captured Berat in 1417.

The memoir of Gjon Muzaka (1515)

His memoir is considered to be the oldest substantial text written by an Albanian. It was originally written in Latin and his name was listed as Giovanni Musachi. In it he mentions several interesting things that were confirmed to have been accurate by Noel Malcolm. Among other things he claims that, according to family history, the name "Musachi" is derived from a corrupted form of the name "Molossachi", ancient tribesmen of Epirus known as the Molossians. In his ancestors includes the Serbian lords
Lazaro Dispoto de Servia and Marco Rè di Bulgaria, and gives some details
about the genealogy of the families Kosace and Crnojevici.

Name 
His name is mentioned in sources in several different versions, like John, Giovanni Ivan, and Jovan.

References

16th-century Albanian people
Year of death unknown
Gjon
Year of birth unknown
Albanian Christians
Eastern Orthodox Christians from Albania